John Digby (1691 – 27 July 1786) was an Irish politician.

Digby sat in the Irish House of Commons as the Member of Parliament for Kildare Borough between 1732 and 1760.

References

1691 births
1786 deaths
Irish MPs 1727–1760
Members of the Parliament of Ireland (pre-1801) for County Kildare constituencies
Politicians from County Kildare